Adalbert Czerny (25 March 1863 – 3 October 1941) was an Austrian pediatrician and is considered co-founder of modern pediatrics. Several children's diseases were named after him.

Education and career
Son of a railway engineer, Czerny grew up in Vienna and as of 1879 in Pilsen, where he 
passed his Abitur exam in 1882. He took up medical studies at the German Charles University in Prague. He graduated with his doctoral thesis on a kidney disease in 1888 and took up clinical work as an assistant to Alois Epstein (1849–1918) at the "Findelanstalt" (hospital for foundlings), which was part of the Prague University Hospital.

In 1893, after his habilitation treatise in on glycogen and amaloid disorder and an appertaining lecture on the nutrition of newborns he received two offers for chairs of pediatrics in Innsbruck and Breslau.He opted for Breslau and worked there until 1910. In 1906 he was offered a position as full professor for pediatrics in Munich, but he declined it and as a reward was made personal full professor at the Breslau University including a considerable raise of his salary.  
When he was offered the chair of pediatrics in the new Children's Hospital in Strassburg in 1910 he accepted and worked there until 1913, when he became the successor of Otto Heubner as full professor for pediatrics at the Berlin Charité. For the next 19 years he worked there and – among other achievements – founded the international School of Pediatrics.
As professor emeritus he accepted a chair for pediatrics at the Medical Academy in Düsseldorf, where he temporarily was head of the local Children's Hospital from 1934 to 1936.
Czerny was married and had one son Marianus (1896 –1985), who was a full professor for experimental physics in Frankfurt from 1938 to 1961.

Czerny died on 3 October 1941 in Berlin and was buried in Pilsen.

Achievements as co-founder of modern pediatrics 

The school founded by Czerny was mainly concerned with nutrition physiology and metabolic pathology of neonates. During his time of work at the Berlin University Children's Hospital he carried on with research work on infant mortality, as it had already been started by Heubner and gave it a scientific foundation. Together with his pupil and colleague Arthur Keller (1868–1934) he summarized the results of his Breslau work in 1906 in a two-volume manual "Des Kindes Ernährung, Ernährungsstörungen und Ernährungstherapie" (Children's nutrition, nutritional disturbance and therapeutic nutrition) – among experts simply known as the „Czerny–Keller“.  Further editions were published in 1917 and 1928.

This work has basically determined the teaching of nutrition in pediatrics and as a result influenced the development of pediatrics itself up to the present. The term disorder of nutrition, which Czerny used, showed the relation between nutrition on the one and disease on the other hand. Czerny distinguished three groups of damages i. e. (a) due to nutrition, (b) due to infections and (c) due to physical constitution.
A second emphasis in his research work was the correlation between nutritional disturbance and the behaviour of the child. His repeatedly re-edited collection of lectures of 1908 
"Der Arzt als Erzieher" ("The physician as an educator") shows this approach in its title.

Discoverer of new clinical symptoms in pediatrics
Children's diseases such as 
 
 nutritional anemia in neonates (Czerny anemia)
 lymphatic−exudative diathesis (Czerny diathesis), a clinical entity, which Czerny clearly distinguished from scrofula and consequently from tuberculosis What he described is an individual disposition to increased sensitivity of the skin and the mucus.
 paradoxical respiration (Czerny respiration)

Acknowledgements and posthumous honours 

The German Association of Children's and Juvenile Medicine (Deutsche Gesellschaft für Kinder- und Jugendmedizin – DGKJ), which was founded in 1883, annually awards the "Adalbert-Czerny Preis" (Adalbert Czerny Award). The award was started in 1963 (the 100th anniversary of Czerny' birth) and goes to persons with outstanding scientific achievements in pediatrics.

Bibliography (selection of German publications) 
Adalbert Czerny & Keller, Arthur: Des Kindes Ernährung, Ernährungsstörungen und Ernährungstherapie: 2 vols. Newest edition Leipzig 1928
 Adalbert Czerny: Der Arzt als Erzieher des Kindes, 6. ed. Leipzig 1922
 Adalbert Czerny: Die Entstehung und Bedeutung der Angst im Leben des Kindes, Langensalza 1915

Literature and footnotes
Wolfgang U. Eckart & Christoph Gradman: Ärzte-Lexikon Springer, 3. ed. Heidelberg 2006 p. 90 
Rolf Schmoeger: Adalbert Czerny (1863–1941) Mitbegründer der wissenschaftlichen Kinderheilkunde Berlin 2003  = Schmoeger (2003) (note: this book has no proper page numbering, but contains a number of interesting illustrations)
Hans Kleinschmidt: Zum siebzigsten Geburtstage von Adalbert Czerny am 25. März 1933  in: Klinische Wochenschrift 12 (1933) p. 486f. also available as PDF-File

References

External links 
 
 acknowledgement of Czerny's achievements 
 

1863 births
1941 deaths
German pediatricians
Charles University alumni
Academic staff of the University of Breslau
Academic staff of the University of Strasbourg
Academic staff of the Humboldt University of Berlin
People from Jaworzno